Felon is a commune in the Territoire de Belfort department in Bourgogne-Franche-Comté in northeastern France.

Geography 
Felon is situated on the southern slope of the Vosges, 15 km to the northeast of Belfort.

Climate

Felon has a oceanic climate (Köppen climate classification Cfb).

See also

Communes of the Territoire de Belfort department

References

Communes of the Territoire de Belfort